Summers Mill, also spelled Sommers Mill, is an unincorporated community in Bell County, in the U.S. state of Texas. According to the Handbook of Texas, only 6 people lived in the community in 2000. It is located within the Killeen-Temple-Fort Hood metropolitan area.

History
D.C. Summers built a sawmill in the area around 1880. A post office was established at Summers Mill in 1881 and remained in operation until 1903. The community had three churches, a general store, flour and sawmills, and a cotton gin in 1884. That same year, the community shipped cotton, cottonseed, and wheat. Its population was 75 in 1896 and grew to 129 in 1904. There were several scattered houses in Summers Mill in 1948. There was a cemetery and several scattered, abandoned homes in 1964. Its population was 6 from 1990 through 2000.

Geography

Education
In 1903, Summers Mill had a school with 58 students and one teacher and continued to operate in 1948. Today, the community is served by the Belton Independent School District. Schools zoned for the community are Miller Heights Elementary School, Lake Belton Middle School, and Belton High School.

References

Unincorporated communities in Texas
Unincorporated communities in Bell County, Texas